John Strickland is a British director.

John Strickland may also refer to:

 John Estmond Strickland, businessman
John Strickland (basketball)